The discography of Swervedriver, an English alternative rock band, consists of six studio albums, one compilation album, one video album, seven extended plays, and eighteen singles. The band's back catalog of non-studio-album material rivals that which has been released in album format.

Swervedriver was formed in 1989 by vocalist and guitarist Adam Franklin, guitarist Jimmy Hartridge, bassist Adrian "Adi" Vines, and drummer Graham Bonnar. Though emerging from the shoegazing scene of Oxford, the band also incorporated contemporary American guitar rock into its sound. They signed with British independent record label Creation and released the Son of Mustang Ford and Rave Down EPs in 1990. In early 1991, the band signed with American label A&M Records and put forth its third EP, Sandblasted. The band then released its debut full-length album, Raise, later that year, charting 44th in the UK.

Following the departure of founding members Bonnar and Vines, Swervedriver enlisted new drummer Jeremy "Jez" Hindmarsh in 1993 and released their second album, Mezcal Head (with Franklin and Hartridge splitting bass duties). The album debuted at number 55 on the UK chart and provided their most popular single, "Duel", which reached number 60. Bassist Steve George also joined the group, and after two years of touring and recording, they released their third album, Ejector Seat Reservation, in 1995. Label troubles thwarted a North American release of Ejector Seat Reservation and later forced the band to seek out independent label Zero Hour from New York City to release 1998's indie rock-styled fourth effort, 99th Dream.

At the end of 1998, the band dissolved for what would become a nine-year hiatus. On 14 March 2005, Castle Music released Juggernaut Rides '89–'98, a two-disc anthology compiling numerous tracks that had previously been only on seven-inch singles or unavailable. Swervedriver announced their reunion on 19 October 2007; the band would release its first material in fifteen years with the 2013 single "Deep Wound" on Tym Records. They have since released two more full-length albums, I Wasn't Born to Lose You on Cobraside in 2015 and Future Ruins in 2019, with former touring stand-ins and new permanent members drummer Mikey Jones and bassist Mick Quinn.

Albums

Studio albums

Compilation albums

Video albums

Extended plays

Singles

Notes

References

External links
 

Alternative rock discographies
Rock music group discographies
Discographies of British artists